is a Japanese voice actress and narrator from Osaka Prefecture, Japan. She is represented by Sigma Seven. Some of her major roles are Kaolla Su in Love Hina, Luxandra Frail in Divergence Eve, Tadase Hotori in Shugo Chara!, Maki in Minami-ke, and Nobunaga Asakura in Nogizaka Haruka no Himitsu. In video games, she voices Cassandra Alexandra in the Soulcalibur series.

Filmography

Anime

Theatrical animation

Video games

Drama CDs

Tokusatsu

Dubbing

References

External links 
 Official agency profile 
 

1973 births
Living people
Japanese video game actresses
Japanese voice actresses
Sigma Seven voice actors
Voice actresses from Osaka Prefecture
20th-century Japanese actresses
21st-century Japanese actresses